= Redfernella delicata =

Scientific classification
- Kingdom: Animalia
- Phylum: Mollusca
- Class: Gastropoda
- Subclass: Caenogastropoda
- Order: Neogastropoda
- Family: Columbellidae
- Genus: Redfernella
- Species: R. delicata

Binomial name
- Redfernella delicata (Ortea, Espinosa & Fernandez-Garcès, 2008)

Synonyms
- Steironepion delicatum Ortea, Espinosa & Fernandez-Garcès, 2008; Steironepion delicatus Ortea, Espinosa & Fernandez-Garcès, 2008 (Missp.)

Species of gastropod

Redfernella delicata is a species of sea snail, a marine gastropod mollusk in the family Columbellidae, the dove snails.
